Jože Pogačnik (22 April 1932 – 16 February 2016) was a Slovenian film director and screenwriter.

After studying film directing, Pogačnik first worked as a film critic, before becoming a prominent author of documentary films in the 1960s, mainly dealing with social issues. He also made several short films, including Tri etide za Cathy i Miloša, which won the Silver Bear award at the 1972 Berlin International Film Festival.

In 1967 he made his first feature film Stronghold of Toughs (Slovenian: Grajski biki), and he won the Golden Arena for Best Director for his last feature film Cafe Astoria (Kavarna Astoria, 1989) at the 1989 Pula Film Festival.

Selected filmography
Stronghold of Toughs (Grajski biki, 1967)
Cafe Astoria (Kavarna Astoria, 1989)

References

External links

Jože Pogačnik at the Slovenian Film Fund website 

Slovenian film directors
Slovenian screenwriters
Male screenwriters
1932 births
2016 deaths
Writers from Maribor
Prešeren Award laureates
Golden Arena for Best Director winners
Yugoslav film directors